Horst Goeldel-Bronikowen (born 7 June 1883, date of death unknown) was a German sport shooter who competed in the 1912 Summer Olympics.

He won the bronze medal in the clay pigeons team event. He also competed in the trap competition and finished twelfth and in the 100 metre running deer, single shots event he finished 24th.

References

External links
profile

1883 births
Year of death missing
German male sport shooters
Shooters at the 1912 Summer Olympics
Olympic shooters of Germany
Olympic bronze medalists for Germany
Olympic medalists in shooting
Medalists at the 1912 Summer Olympics